Ignacio Prieto Urrejola (born September 23, 1943) is a former Chilean footballer who played for 5 clubs and in the Chile national football team in the FIFA World Cup England 1966.

Teams (Player)
 Universidad Católica 1962-1967
 Nacional 1968-1971
 Lille 1971-1976
 Laval 1976-1977
 Universidad Católica 1977-1979

Teams (Coach)
 Universidad Católica 1983-1990
 Cruz Azul 1990-1992
 Universidad Católica 1992-1993
 Colo-Colo 1994

Personal
His father, Fernando Prieto Concha, nicknamed Palomeque, was one of the founders of C.D. Green Cross as well as a forward of the same club.

He is the younger brother of the former Chile international footballer Andrés Prieto. From his brother, he is the uncle of José Antonio Prieto or Toño, a well-known sports journalist in Chilean radio media.

Other works
 ALEF (Latin American Football Managers Association): Vice-President (2004)
 Colegio de Técnicos de Chile (Football Managers Association of Chile): President (2005–2007)

Titles (Player)
 Universidad Católica (national): 1966 (Chilean Primera División)
 Universidad Católica (friendlies): , 1985 Trofeo Ciudad de Alicante, 
 Nacional (national): 1969, 1970, 1971 (Uruguayan Primera División)
 Nacional (international): 1971 Copa Libertadores, 1971 Intercontinental Cup
 Lille: 1973–74 (French Division 2)

 Chile:

Titles (Coach)
 Universidad Católica: 1983 Copa Polla Gol, 1983 Copa República, 1984, 1987 (Chilean Primera División)
 Colo-Colo: 1994 (Copa Chile)

References

External links
 Ignacio Prieto at PartidosdeLaRoja 

1943 births
Living people
Footballers from Santiago
Chilean footballers
Chilean expatriate footballers
Chile international footballers
Club Deportivo Universidad Católica footballers
Club Nacional de Football players
Lille OSC players
Stade Lavallois players
Chilean Primera División players
Uruguayan Primera División players
Ligue 1 players
Ligue 2 players
Copa Libertadores-winning players
Association football midfielders
Association football defenders
Chilean football managers
Chilean expatriate football managers
Club Deportivo Universidad Católica managers
Cruz Azul managers
Colo-Colo managers
Chilean Primera División managers
Liga MX managers
Expatriate footballers in Uruguay
Expatriate footballers in France
Expatriate football managers in Mexico
Chilean expatriate sportspeople in Uruguay
Chilean expatriate sportspeople in France
Chilean expatriate sportspeople in Mexico
1966 FIFA World Cup players
1967 South American Championship players